The Wisconsin Rapids Daily Tribune traces its history to a Wisconsin Rapids, Wisconsin newspaper started in the early 1900s by William F. Huffman, Sr. The newspaper today is a daily broadsheet with a circulation of 7,888 (2012 ABC data) serving mainly Wood County, Wisconsin.

Owned by Gannett, which also owns the nearby Stevens Point Journal and Marshfield News-Herald, the reporters and editors of the Daily Tribune focus on local news and sports.

The newspaper was formerly owned by Thomson Newspapers Inc.

In the 1990s, the paper was at the center of a controversial murder case, when the Daily Tribune'''s receptionist, Jayne Susan Jacobson, murdered publisher David Gentry's secretary, Julie Schroer at Schroer's home in 1990. Jacobson was found not guilty by reason of mental disease or defect and was released within a few years of the slaying.

Among former staffers of this newspaper are Robert D. McFadden, a Pulitzer Prize-winning senior reporter for The New York Times, who worked for the Daily Tribune from 1957 to 1958; Robert Des Jarlais, an award-winning sports and general news editor and reporter at the Daily Tribune from the mid-1960s until shortly before his untimely death in 2003; and David L. Van Wormer, an Outdoor Writer for the Milwaukee Journal, a sportswriter and editor for the Tribune'' at various times between 1970 and 1995.

References

External links

 Wisconsin Rapids Daily Tribune official site
 Mobile phone website
 Gannett subsidiary profile of The Daily Tribune

Newspapers published in Wisconsin
Wood County, Wisconsin
Gannett publications